"Uramaki" is a song by Italian singer Mahmood. It was released on 27 April 2018, as the lead single from his debut studio album, Gioventù bruciata (2019). Mahmood co-wrote the song with Francesco Fugazza and Marcello Grilli, the latter also produced it under the name Mutt. It debuted at number 86 on the Italian Singles Chart in February 2019, after the release of the album.

Music video
Directed by Martina Pastori, the music video for "Uramaki" was shot in Chinatown, Milan. It premiered on 2 May 2018, via Mahmood's YouTube channel.

Charts

References

2018 singles
2018 songs
Island Records singles
Mahmood (singer) songs
Songs written by Mahmood